The Texas Property and Casualty Insurance Guaranty Association (TPCIGA) is the state-designated insurance guaranty association for property insurance and casualty insurance claims in Texas. It is headquartered in North Burnet–Gateway, Austin.

History
The TPCIGA was formed by the 62nd Texas Legislature.

Purpose and scope

According to the Texas State Auditor's Office, the "Association's purpose is to pay, fairly and in a timely manner, valid insurance claims involving insolvent property and casualty insurance companies, according to Texas laws".

TPCIGA's designation includes commercial property insurance, home insurance, liability insurance, renters' insurance, vehicle insurance, and workers' compensation.

References

External links
 Official site

Insurance in Texas
Organizations based in Austin, Texas